Unonopsis velutina is a species of plant in the Annonaceae family. It is endemic to Venezuela.

References

Flora of Venezuela
Annonaceae
Least concern plants
Taxonomy articles created by Polbot